Chunaw  is a village in Hsawlaw Township in Myitkyina District in the Kachin State of north-eastern Burma. Chunaw (Hindi word) is known as election and name of election site like as chunaw.com

References

External links
  Search for chunaw in India

Populated places in Kachin State
Hsawlaw Township